Ernst Drexler (born 30 July 1944) is a German sports shooter. He competed in the mixed skeet event at the 1976 Summer Olympics.

References

1944 births
Living people
German male sport shooters
Olympic shooters of West Germany
Shooters at the 1976 Summer Olympics
Sportspeople from Vienna